Retalhuleu Airport , also known as Base Aérea del Sur, is an airport serving Retalhuleu, the capital of Retalhuleu Department in Guatemala.

The Retalhuleu non-directional beacon (Ident: REU) is located on the field.

Statistics
The airport handled 1,442 passengers in 2016.

Airlines and destinations

See also
 Transport in Guatemala
 List of airports in Guatemala

References

External links
 Retalhuleu Airport
 OpenStreetMap - Retalhuleu
 
 

Airports in Guatemala
Retalhuleu Department